Nikolai Nikolayevich Lodyzhensky (Russian: Николай Николаевич Лодыженский) was a Russian composer and diplomat.

Lodyzhensky was born in Saint Petersburg. He was the son of an impoverished landowner, and came from a musical family related to the composer Alexander Dargomyzhsky. His student years are obscure. He established a diplomatic career, and in 1866 he joined the circle of Mily Balakirev and The Five, but without abandoning his career. He was valued as an improvisor at the piano. His sister Anka fell in love with Alexander Borodin, who had to write many letters to his wife to explain his daily meetings with her.

Lodyzhensky started several symphonies, an opera Dmitri the Usurper (based on Alexander Pushkin's play Boris Godunov) and a cantata The Rusalka, but never finished them. He abandoned his opera when Modest Mussorgsky started writing an opera to the same libretto (Boris Godunov). Mussorgsky nicknamed him "Fim" (Фим; the reverse spelling of миф, the Russian word for "myth"). Borodin wrote his String Quartet No. 2 in D while spending a summer holiday at Lodyzhensky's estate at Zhitovo in 1881. Lodyzhensky himself wrote some music in the string quartet genre.
The only music he ever published was Six Romances for voice and piano, in 1873, which showed great promise, displaying melodic and harmonic invention. Another set of four romances is in manuscript. His early work gained the respect of Nikolai Rimsky-Korsakov and Vladimir Stasov, but he was criticised in other quarters and this may have discouraged him from continuing to compose. That year, 1873, he was sent to Budapest, from where he wrote to Stasov saying he could not dedicate himself to composing as he had formerly intended.

He was posted to the Balkans and later to New York City, where he was Consul-General for Russia. He returned to Russia in 1907, where he was engaged on official duties, voluntary work, and founded the Society for the Unification of the Orthodox and Anglican Churches. He died in 1916 in the city of his birth, then known as Petrograd.

References

Sources
 Grove's Dictionary of Music and Musicians, 5th ed, 1954

1840s births
1916 deaths
Russian composers
Russian male composers
Diplomats of the Russian Empire
Diplomats from Saint Petersburg
Musicians from Saint Petersburg